The 1961 NCAA College Division football season was the sixth season of college football in the United States organized by the National Collegiate Athletic Association at the NCAA College Division level.

Conference standings

Rankings

Small college poll
In 1961, both United Press International (UPI) and the Associated Press (AP) conducted "small college" polls. The number one selection of both wire services was the Pittsburg State Gorillas, who compiled a regular season record of 9–0 while outscoring opponents 299–25 and registering seven shutouts. The Gorillas went on to win two NAIA postseason games and finished 11–0 for the season.

United Press International (coaches) final poll
Published on November 22

Baldwin–Wallace was 9–0 when the poll was taken.

Associated Press (writers) final poll
Published on November 22

See also
 1961 NCAA University Division football season
 1961 NAIA football season

References